Marius de Vries (born 1961) is an English music producer and composer. He has won a Grammy Award from four nominations, two BAFTA Awards, and an Ivor Novello Award.

Education
Marius de Vries was educated at St Paul's Cathedral School, Bedford School (between 1975-1980) and then at Peterhouse, Cambridge.

Career

Music producer

Recording artists he has collaborated with include Bjork, Madonna, Massive Attack, David Bowie, U2, Rufus Wainwright, Chrissie Hynde, Neil Finn, Annie Lennox, Bebel Gilberto, David Gray, P.J. Harvey, Elbow, and Josh Groban.

De Vries served as the executive music producer for the 2016 film La La Land and produced the accompanying soundtrack. He also co-wrote the song "Start a Fire" alongside John Legend, Justin Hurwitz, and Angelique Cinelu, and had a small role in the film as a casting director.

Composer/film scores

De Vries was the music director of the 2001 film Moulin Rouge! and worked with Nellee Hooper on the film soundtrack of Romeo + Juliet as co-composer, programmer, and co-producer. Both of these projects won de Vries BAFTA awards, and he was awarded an Ivor Novello Award for his compositional work on the former.

He also wrote the scores for Stephan Elliott's surreal thriller Eye of the Beholder as well as Elliott's adaptation of the Noël Coward comedy Easy Virtue. The latter is notable musically for using the real singing voices of leading actors Ben Barnes, Jessica Biel, and Colin Firth.

In 2010, he co-wrote the score of Kick-Ass with John Murphy, Henry Jackman and Ilan Eshkeri. He co-produced, along with Tyler Bates and Zack and Deborah Snyder, and performed on the soundtrack of Snyder's 2011 film Sucker Punch.

In 2020 and 2021, he composed the score for Sian Heder's CODA, and served as Executive Music Producer on Leos Carax's Annette.

Partial list of songs produced 
Songs by Teddy Thompson

Songs by Rufus Wainwright

Awards and nominations 
BAFTA Awards

Grammy Awards

Ivor Novello Awards

World Soundtrack Awards

References

External links

Marius de Vries interview: Brave New World

1961 births
Living people
English record producers
Musicians from London
Alumni of Peterhouse, Cambridge
Best Original Music BAFTA Award winners
Grammy Award winners
Ivor Novello Award winners
People educated at Bedford School
British people of Dutch descent